Philippe Busquin (born 6 January 1941) is a Belgian politician.

Busquin was born in Feluy. He was a Member of the European Parliament from 2004 to 2009 for the French Community of Belgium with the Parti Socialiste, part of the Socialist Group and sat on the European Parliament's Committee on Industry, Research and Energy. Busquin was the chairman of the Science and Technology Options Assessment Panel. He also was a substitute for the Committee on the Environment, Public Health and Food Safety and a member of the Delegation to the EU-Russia Parliamentary Cooperation Committee. His tendency to stutter has been the subject of satirical videos on YouTube, some garnering hundreds of thousands of hits.

From 1999 to 2004, he was Member of the European Commission with responsibility for research.

Education
1962: Degree in physics from the Free University of Brussels
1976: Postgraduate certificate in environmental studies
1980: First degree in philosophy at the Free University of Brussels

Career
1962–1977: Lecturer at the Nivelles teacher training college
Assistant lecturer at the Free University of Brussels
1992–1999: Chairman of the PS
since 1992: Vice-President of the Socialist International
1994–1996: Vice-President of the PES
1995–1999: Mayor of Seneffe
1977–1978: Ordinary Member for the province of Hainaut
1982–1986: Minister for the Budget and Energy for the Walloon Region
1986: Minister of Economic Affairs for the Walloon Region
1979–1994: Member of the national Parliament
1994–1999: Senator
1980–1982: Minister of Education
1981: Minister of the Interior
1987: Minister for Social Affairs
since 1992: Minister of State
1999–2004: Member of the European Commission with responsibility for research
2004–2009: Member of the European Parliament (MEP)

Honours
He was awarded: 
  : Grand Cross of the Order of Leopold II (1995)
  : Commander of the Order of Leopold (1987)
  : Civic Medal, First Class (1988)
 Honorary Doctorate from Heriot-Watt University (2004)

See also
 2004 European Parliament election in Belgium

References

External links

|-

|-

1941 births
Living people
Belgian European Commissioners
Belgian Ministers of State
Belgian socialists
Free University of Brussels (1834–1969) alumni
MEPs for Belgium 2004–2009
Socialist Party (Belgium) MEPs
Walloon people

Recipients of the Grand Cross of the Order of Leopold II